Air Guinee International was a planned airline based in Conakry, Guinea. Created in partnership between the Government of Guinea and the China International Fund. Air Guinée International should offer regular flights in the neighboring region. The company overtook Boeing 737-300  family aircraft using European safety standards (JAR-OPS). But, however, the airline did not commence operation.

See also		
 List of defunct airlines of Guinea
 Transport in Guinea

References

External links
 www.jetphotos.net.

Defunct airlines of Guinea
Conakry